Low-set ears are a clinical feature in which the ears are positioned lower on the head than usual. They are present in many congenital conditions. Low-set ears are defined as the outer ears being positioned two or more standard deviations lower than the population average. Clinically, if the point at which the helix (curved upper part) of the outer ear meets the cranium is at or below the line connecting the inner canthi of eyes (the bicanthal plane), the ears are considered low set.

Low-set ears can be associated with conditions such as:
Down syndrome
Turner syndrome
Noonan syndrome
Patau syndrome
DiGeorge syndrome
Cri du chat syndrome
Edwards syndrome
Fragile X syndrome
Okamoto syndrome
It is usually bilateral, but it can be unilateral (one sided) in Goldenhar syndrome.

See also
LEOPARD syndrome

References

External links 

Diseases of the ear and mastoid process
Congenital disorders of ears